The Kid Detective is a 2020 Canadian mystery comedy-drama film written and directed by Evan Morgan and starring Adam Brody, Sophie Nélisse, Wendy Crewson, Sarah Sutherland, and Tzi Ma. It was inspired by the Encyclopedia Brown book series.

The Kid Detective was screened in the industry program at the 2020 Toronto International Film Festival. It received a national theatrical release in the U.S. on October 16, 2020, as the second wave of the COVID-19 pandemic in the United States took hold.

Plot
As a child, Abe Applebaum was a local celebrity as a "kid detective," solving minor mysteries and crimes for the residents of the town of Willowbrook. When he was twelve, his close friend, Gracie Gulliver, disappeared. Despite his investigation, neither he nor the police were able to find her, leaving him traumatized.

Now 32, Abe continues to operate his detective agency, despite the concern from his family and derision from his peers for his failure to "grow up." Depressed over his struggling business and the complete lack of respect he is given, he abuses alcohol and drugs to cope. An orphaned high school student named Caroline approaches him for help investigating the murder of her boyfriend, Patrick Chang. Despite never having investigated a murder case before, Abe sees this as a chance to prove himself and agrees to take the case for free.

Their investigation leads to the discovery of several secrets that Patrick had kept from Caroline, such as his involvement in drug dealing and his affair with an older girl named Melody. They also learn that his friend Calvin is in love with Caroline, and resented their relationship. However, Abe's clumsy style of work also leads to several mishaps, such as angering Patrick's father and being arrested for sneaking into Calvin's house. He eventually reaches a breakthrough when he realizes that a series of origami roses given to Caroline were not from Patrick, as she assumed, and are identical to ones that were received by Gracie shortly before her disappearance. When he also learns that the person he implicated in the theft of school fundraiser money as a child was actually innocent, he is able to deduce the identity of both Gracie's kidnapper and Patrick's killer as being high school principal Erwin.

Abe confronts Principal Erwin at his home and reveals what he has learned. Erwin had become obsessed with Gracie and plotted to kidnap her. The theft of the school fundraiser money had been a test to see if Abe really was as good a detective as people thought, and when he failed to solve the case correctly, Erwin felt confident in carrying out his plan. Caroline is, in fact, the product of Erwin's rape of Gracie and had secretly been left at a church by Erwin after her birth. When he found a lewd picture of Melody in Patrick's locker, he mistook it for Caroline and killed Patrick in revenge for "ruining" her. With his crimes revealed, and confronted by the fact that he murdered Patrick over a mistake, Erwin kills himself in front of Abe. Abe subsequently discovers Gracie, still alive, locked in a shed in Erwin's yard.

Abe is hailed as a hero for solving the case and rescuing Gracie, restoring his respect in town and greatly boosting his agency's business. However, he is haunted by the recent events, and when his parents come to check on him, he breaks down sobbing as the movie ends.

Cast

Production
Principal photography took place in North Bay, Ontario, Canada.

Release
In October 2020, Stage 6 Films acquired distribution rights to the film, and released it theatrically in the United States on October 16, 2020. Level Film set a theatrical release date in Canada for November 6, 2020, and Sony Picture Releasing released the film on November 20, 2020 in the United Kingdom.

Reception
The site's critics consensus reads, "A low-key charmer led by Adam Brody's sharp performance, The Kid Detective uncovers dark comedy in a story of unfulfilled childhood potential." Metacritic gives the film a weighted average score of 74 out of 100, based on 14 critics, indicating "generally favorable reviews."

Writing for Variety, Tomris Laffly said "Adam Brody delivers a layered performance as a past-his-prime PI in debuting director Evan Morgan's sharp crime tale with shockingly dark twists." John Defore of The Hollywood Reporter wrote, "Morgan's script generously allows us to deduce the truth just before Abe stumbles across it, which is not to say it doesn't have some real surprises left. It's fun to watch Abe put A and B together, and to regain some of his self-respect in the process. But even victory will bring mixed emotions, which Morgan conveys with unsettling finesse." The Los Angeles Times''' reviewer Michael Ordoña stated, "The Kid Detective is an unexpected mix of disparate elements that in the wrong hands could have resulted in lumpy parody but, fortunately, pours out as something smooth, funny, dark and potent."

The film was named to TIFF's year-end Canada's Top Ten list for feature films. It received four Canadian Screen Award nominations at the 9th Canadian Screen Awards in 2021, for Best Original Screenplay (Morgan), Best Art Direction or Production Design (Jennifer Morden and Matthew Bianchi), Best Original Score (Jay McCarrol) and the John Dunning Best First Feature Award.

References

External links
 
 The Kid Detective'' at Library and Archives Canada

2020 films
2020 comedy-drama films
2020s mystery comedy-drama films
English-language Canadian films
Canadian mystery comedy-drama films
Films about missing people
Films about rape
Canadian detective films
2020s English-language films
Films shot in North Bay, Ontario
2020s Canadian films